Perfume, Ribbons & Pearls is the second studio album by American country music group The Forester Sisters. It was released via Warner Bros. Records Nashville in 1986.

Content
Only one single was released from the album: "Lonely Alone", which charted at number 2 on Billboard Hot Country Songs in 1986.

Critical reception
Cliff Radel of The Cincinnati Enquirer rated the album 2 out of 5 stars, calling the singing "clear as the sky on a crisp fall day" but criticizing the "poverty stricken songs". Montreal Gazette writer Lucinda Chodan contrasted the quartet's sound with that of The Judds, stating that "those celestial voices are harmonizing in the service of songs that, for the most part, are about as individual as pennies in a jar." She thought that "100% Chance of Blue" and the cover of The Supremes' "Back in My Arms Again" were the most distinct songs, but still criticized the production.

Track listing

Personnel

The Forester Sisters 
 Christy Forester – lead vocals (3), backing vocals 
 June Forester – lead vocals (8), backing vocals 
 Kathy Forester – lead vocals (1, 5, 6, 9), backing vocals 
 Kim Forester – lead vocals (2, 4, 7, 10), backing vocals

Additional Musicians 
 Steve Nathan – keyboards
 Ray Flacke – electric guitar
 Will McFarlane – acoustic guitar, electric guitar
 J.L. Wallace – electric guitar, string arrangements and conductor 
 John Willis – acoustic guitar
 Sonny Garrish – steel guitar
 Lonnie "Butch" Ledford – bass guitar
 Owen Hale – drums
 Hoot Hester – fiddle
 The Birmingham Strings – strings

Production 
 Terry Skinner – producer, recording assistant 
 J.L. Wallace – producer 
 Steve Melton – recording, mixing 
 Billy Lynn – recording assistant 
 Paul Mann – recording assistant
 Jerell Sockwell – recording assistant
 E.J. Walsh – recording assistant
 Marty Williams – recording assistant 
 Jerry Masters – special string engineer 
 Glenn Meadows – mastering at Masterfonics (Nashville, Tennessee)
 Paige Rowden – production coordinator 
 Gabrielle Raumberger – art direction, design 
 Kelly Ray – set design 
 Steven Rothfeld – photography 
 Gerald Roy and Stellar Entertainment – management

Chart performance

References

1986 albums
The Forester Sisters albums
Warner Records albums